Nataša Ljepoja (born 28 January 1996) is a Slovenian handball player for RK Krim and the Slovenian national team. She has previously played for the club RK Zagorje.

She represented Slovenia at the 2019 World Women's Handball Championship.

References

External links

1996 births
Living people
Sportspeople from Celje
Slovenian female handball players
Competitors at the 2018 Mediterranean Games
Mediterranean Games bronze medalists for Slovenia
Mediterranean Games medalists in handball
21st-century Slovenian women